The Malbaie River in the Charlevoix region empties into the Saint Lawrence River at La Malbaie. Until 1985 the river was used to transport logs downstream. It flows through a steep valley known as Les Hautes Gorges. A sugar maple and American elm forest grows in the gorge and has remained largely undisturbed for hundreds of years.

Its course successively crosses Grands-Jardins National Park, Laurentides Wildlife Reserve, Zec des Martres, Hautes-Gorges-de-la-Rivière-Malbaie National Park and Zec du Lac-au-Sable. It winds first towards the north-east, towards the east, then towards the south-east, in a narrow and deep glacial valley, for 161 kilometers and a drop of 820 meters.

Its course forms a semicircle stretching towards the north and completely encircling in its center the hydrographic slope of the Rivière du Gouffre. Its watershed and that of the rivière du Gouffre form the Charlevoix Biosphere Reserve.

Le Hautes-Gorges-de-la-Rivière-Malbaie National Park is home to Eastern Canada's tallest rock-faced cliffs. Designated a national park (of the province of Québec) in 2000, the 233-km2 Hautes-Gorges is the centrepiece of the UNESCO Charlevoix biosphere reserve.

Geography 

"Little Tristan Lake" is the "head lake" of the Malbaie River hydrographic slope. It is located in a swampy area in a small valley of mountains. It discharges to the north where water flows  through swamps to Tristan Lake ( long) that flows through its full length from south to north. This last lake has a large central island.

Lake Frenette receives by the north-west the waters of lakes Carroll, Milton and Brunette.

The Malbaie Lake outlet is located to the north.

Upper course of the Malbaie River downstream of Malbaie Lake (segment of )

  towards the north by collecting the outlet of Lac Saulmer (coming from the west), then branching east, until the outlet (coming from the north) of a series of lakes including Lac à Jack, Lac Fronsac and Petit Lac à Jack;
  towards the north-east by collecting the outlet (coming from the north-west) from the Lac des Sixty-Six, then towards the north, until the confluence of the Jardin River;
  towards the north by collecting the discharge (coming from the south-east) of Lake Duberger, until the confluence of the L'Enfer River;
  to the north by collecting the discharge (coming from the west) from Pigeon Lake, then bending towards the northeast at the end of the segment, until the confluence of the Petite rivière Malbaie (coming from the east);
  towards the north bending towards the northwest at the end of the segment up to a bend corresponding to the confluence of the Chemin des Canots River (coming from the south);
  to the north, forming some coils up to the Barley river (coming from the east);
  towards the north by collecting the Cold stream (coming from the east) and the Cow's stream (coming from the west), forming a loop towards the northeast and an S , to the confluence of the rivière à la Cruche (coming from the west);

Intermediate course of the Malbaie river downstream of the Cruche River (segment of )

  north-east until the confluence of the Porc-Épic River (coming from the east);
  towards the north, forming a large curve towards the east, up to the outlet (coming from the east) of the lake;
  towards the northwest by collecting the Cran Rouge stream (coming from the south) up to a bend in the river;
  north-east to Caribou stream (coming from the east);
  northeasterly to ruisseau à John (Malbaie River) (coming from the north);
  to the east in a deep valley by collecting the discharge (coming from the north) from Lac Plat, then forming a loop towards the south, to a stream (coming from the north) ;
  towards the east in a deep valley crossing a few rapids at the start of the segment, collecting the North stream (coming from the south) and Scott stream (coming from the north), until at a bend in the river;
  to the south in a deep valley crossing the “Les Eaux-Mortes” section and a widening of the river, up to the rivière des Martres (coming from Where is);

Lower course of the Malbaie river downstream of the Martres river (segment of )

  towards the south-east until the Ruisseau des Érables (coming from the south-west);
  east to the Larouche stream (from the south), then northeast to the Pont stream (from the northwest);
  to the east, then south, passing to the east of a mountain, collecting the Cold stream (coming from the west), to the Foulon stream (coming from West);
  towards the south by forming a loop towards the west at the end of the segment, up to the Rouillé stream (coming from the southwest);
  by forming a  hook towards the north, then towards the east, the south-east and finally the east, until the brook of the Americans (coming from the north);

Lower course of the Malbaie river downstream from the ruisseau des Americans (segment of )

  to the south, forming a large curve towards the east, collecting the stream of Beavers (coming from the east), up to the stream of Pied des Monts (coming from the Where is);
  towards the south-east by collecting the outlet (coming from the west) of Long Lake, then towards the northeast by winding, until the outlet of Lake Nairne (coming from South);
  towards the east by forming a big loop towards the north, until the confluence of the Snigole River (coming from the northwest) which flows in the middle of a dam lake;
  to the east by crossing a small dam, up to the confluence of the Jacob (coming from the north);
  to the east, forming large loops in the town of La Malbaie, until the confluence of the Comporté River (coming from the north);
  eastward to its mouth.

The Malbaie River flows into downtown La Malbaie on the northwest shore of the St. Lawrence River.

Toponymy 
In 1608, Samuel de Champlain named this stream "Rivière Platte" or "Malle Baye". After the English conquest, the seigneuries of Mount Murray and Murray Bay, so that the English have long named this river Murray River. With time, the Malbaie river finally prevails.

Champlain calls the bay "Malbaie" in the sense of bad because at low tide the latter dries up and the boats run aground. As for "Murray", he owes his name to James Murray, first governor of province of Quebec, which conceded two seigneuries at the mouth of the river.

See also 

 Malbaie Lake (La Côte-de-Beaupré)
 La Malbaie, a municipality
 Laurentides Wildlife Reserve
 Grands-Jardins
 Hautes-Gorges-de-la-Rivière-Malbaie
 Biosphere Reserve of Charlevoix
 Petite rivière Malbaie
 St. Lawrence River
 List of rivers of Quebec

Notes and references 

La Malbaie
Rivers of Capitale-Nationale
Tributaries of the Saint Lawrence River
Laurentides Wildlife Reserve